Jack Nicholson is an American actor, director, producer, and screenwriter who made his film debut in The Cry Baby Killer (1958). Nicholson is widely regarded as one of the greatest actors of his generation. He is also one of the most critically acclaimed: his 12 Academy Award nominations make him the most nominated male actor in the Academy's history. He is also a Kennedy Center Honoree and a recipient of the AFI Life Achievement Award and the Golden Globe Cecil B. DeMille Award.

In the first decade of his acting career, Nicholson had several minor roles in film and television, only having significant parts in independent films. Nicholson's breakout role was in the countercultural Easy Rider (1969). Nicholson next appeared in Five Easy Pieces (1970). He then starred in the comedy-drama Carnal Knowledge (1971). His performance in The Last Detail (1973) garnered him the Cannes Best Actor Award. For his performance in the Roman Polanski-directed Chinatown (1974), he was awarded the Golden Globe Award for Best Actor – Motion Picture Drama. He then portrayed Randle McMurphy in the Miloš Forman-directed One Flew Over the Cuckoo's Nest (1975), which won Best Picture and garnered him the Academy Award for Best Actor and Golden Globe Award for Best Actor – Motion Picture Drama. In 1976, he starred in the film adaptation of F. Scott Fitzgerald's The Last Tycoon (1941). Also that year, Nicholson costarred with Marlon Brando in the western The Missouri Breaks. In 1978, Nicholson directed and starred in another western, Goin' South.

In 1980, Nicholson played Jack Torrance in Stanley Kubrick's The Shining. For his portrayal of playwright Eugene O'Neill in Reds (1981), Nicholson was awarded the BAFTA Award for Best Actor in a Supporting Role. He won the Academy Award for Best Supporting Actor and Golden Globe Award for Best Supporting Actor – Motion Picture for his acting in Terms of Endearment (1983). He later returned in the 1996 sequel The Evening Star. He collaborated with director John Huston in Prizzi's Honor (1985), for which Nicholson earned another Best Actor nomination from the Academy. His role as Francis Phelan in Ironweed (1987) garnered him yet another Oscar nomination for Best Actor. He then portrayed the Joker in the Tim Burton-directed Batman (1989). Nicholson subsequently directed and acted in The Two Jakes (1990), a sequel to Chinatown. In 1992, he portrayed Jimmy Hoffa in the Danny DeVito-directed Hoffa. That year Nicholson also appeared in the Rob Reiner-directed A Few Good Men. He collaborated with Burton again on Mars Attacks! (1996). His next role in As Good as It Gets (1997) garnered him the Academy Award for Best Actor and the Golden Globe Award for Best Actor – Motion Picture Musical or Comedy. In 2006, he starred alongside Matt Damon and Leonardo DiCaprio in the Martin Scorsese-directed The Departed. He starred opposite Morgan Freeman in the 2007 comedy The Bucket List. His final film appearance was in How Do You Know (2010), after which he reportedly retired due to memory loss.

Film

Television

See also 
List of awards and nominations received by Jack Nicholson

Notes

References

External links
 
 Jack Nicholson at the Rotten Tomatoes

Male actor filmographies
American filmographies